Bernadette Rauter (born 8 August 1949 in Breitenwang) is an Austrian former alpine skier who competed in the 1968 Winter Olympics and 1972 Winter Olympics.

External links
 sports-reference.com

1949 births
Living people
Austrian female alpine skiers
Olympic alpine skiers of Austria
People from Reutte District
Alpine skiers at the 1968 Winter Olympics
Alpine skiers at the 1972 Winter Olympics
Sportspeople from Tyrol (state)
20th-century Austrian women
21st-century Austrian women